Notable orphans and foundlings include world leaders, celebrated writers, entertainment greats, figures in science and business, as well as innumerable fictional characters in literature and comics. While the exact definition of orphan and foundlings varies, one legal definition is a child bereft through "death or disappearance of, abandonment or desertion by, or separation or loss from, both parents". According to the United Nations, the definition of an orphan is anyone that loses one parent, either through death or abandonment.

Figures from classical history and religious scripture

Africa 
 Amenhotep III, pharaoh of the Eighteenth Dynasty
 Hatshepsut, pharaoh of the Eighteenth Dynasty of Egypt
 Thutmose III, Pharaoh of the Eighteenth Dynasty

Asia 
 Aandaal, Tamil saint, found in a temple garden
 Antiochus III the Great, Hellenistic Greek king and the 6th ruler of the Seleucid Empire
 Confucius, Chinese scholar & politician
 Cyrus the Great, Persian emperor, orphaned in childhood
 Esther, Jewish queen of the Persian king Ahasuerus
 Moses, religious leader, given up as an infant
 Sargon of Akkad, ruler of the Semitic-speaking Akkadian Empire
 Saint Nicholas, patron saint of children, orphaned early in childhood
 Pulcheria, Roman ruler "Augusta Imperatrix"

Europe 

 Aristotle, Greek philosopher and scientist, orphaned in early childhood
 Marcus Aurelius, Emperor of Rome
 Britannicus, son of the Roman emperor Claudius and his third wife Valeria Messalina
 Caligula, Roman emperor in AD 37–41
 Cato the Younger, Roman Republic, left an orphan and raised by his uncle
 Hadrian, Roman emperor
 Juba II, king of Numidia and then later moved to Mauretania and his wife Cleopatra Selene II
 Julian, Roman Emperor and philosopher
 Oedipus, mythical Greek king, abandoned on a mountain
 Pancras, Roman religious figure
 Galla Placidia, major force in Roman politics
 Romulus and Remus, traditional founders of Ancient Rome, orphaned in infancy
 Sulla, Roman general and statesman
 Lucius Verus, Roman Emperor

Civic and religious leaders

Africa 
 Al-Hakim bi-Amr Allah, sixth Fatimid caliph and 16th Ismaili imam
 Jean-Hilaire Aubame, Gabonese politician active during both the colonial and independence periods
 Jean-Bédel Bokassa, military officer and the head of state of the Central African Republic and Emperor of Central Africa
 Piet Joubert, military leader in South African Republic
 Jomo Kenyatta, Kenyan politician and the first President of Kenya
 Winnie Madikizela-Mandela, South African activist and politician
 Nelson Mandela, president of South Africa, raised as a ward
 Menelik II, Emperor of Ethiopia
 Mobutu Sese Seko, military dictator and President of the Democratic Republic of the Congo
 Haile Selassie, Emperor of Ethiopia
 Gamal Abdel Nasser, second President of Egypt

Asia 

 Abbas, 5th Shah of Safavid dynasty of Iran
 Akbar, rulers of the Mughal Dynasty in India
 Yasser Arafat, Palestinian leader
 Mustafa Kemal Atatürk, Turkish field marshal, revolutionary statesman, author, and the founding father of the Republic of Turkey
 Chulalongkorn, monarch of Siam
 Sayajirao Gaekwad III, Maharaja of Baroda State
 Go-Momozono, Emperor of Japan
 Go-Sakuramachi, Emperor of Japan
 Go-Toba, Emperor of Japan
 Hongwu, Chinese emperor
 Huineng, Buddhist monk who is one of the most important figures in Chan Buddhism
 Saddam Hussein, 5th President of Iraq
 Hu Jintao, Chinese politician and the paramount leader of China
 Chiang Kai-shek, Chinese political and military leader who served as the leader of the Republic of China
 Genghis Khan, Mongol leader
 Emperor Meiji, 122nd Emperor of Japan
 Mohammad Mosaddegh, Iranian politician, head of a democratically elected government and Prime Minister of Iran
 Muhammad, religious leader, orphaned at age 6
 Nripendra Narayan, Maharaja of the princely state of Koch Bihar
 Li Peng, Chinese politician
 Puyi, Last Emperor of China
 Yitzhak Rabin, Israeli politician, statesman and general and the fifth Prime Minister of Israel
 Madho Singh II, Maharajadhiraja of Jaipur
 Seiwa, Emperor of Japan
 Nader Shah, Iranian rulers
 Reza Shah, Shah of Iran (Persia)
 Adi Shankaracharya, scholar, philosopher, reformer, Advaita Vedanta non-dualism
 Taixu, Buddhist modernist, activist and thinker who advocated the reform and renewal of Chinese Buddhism
 Theodora, empress of the Byzantine Empire
 Bal Gangadhar Tilak, Indian nationalist, teacher, lawyer and an independence activist
 Minamoto no Yoritomo, founder and the first shōgun of the Kamakura shogunate of Japan
 Zhu Rongji, premier of China

Australia/Oceania 
 John Gorton, The nineteenth Prime Minister of Australia
 Kamehameha III, King of Hawaii
 John McEwen, Prime Minister of Australia, at age seven
 William McMahon, Prime Minister of Australia, at age 8 and 18
 Frank Rogers, New Zealand politician

Europe 

 Pope Adrian VI
 Alfred the Great, King of Wessex from 871 to 899
 Yuri Andropov, Chairman of the KGB and General Secretary of the Communist Party of the Soviet Union
 Anna of Russia, Empress of Russia
 Anne of Brittany, French queen
 Anne, Queen of Great Britain, Queen of England, Scotland, and Ireland
 Eleanor of Aquitaine, member of the Ramnulfid dynasty and one of the most powerful women in the High Middle Ages
 Mustafa Kemal Atatürk, Turkish field marshal, revolutionary statesman, author, and the founding father of the Republic of Turkey
 Manuel Azaña, second Prime Minister of the Second Spanish Republic
 August Bebel, German socialist politician, writer, and orator
 Ernest Bevin, British statesman, trade union leader, and Labour politician
 Hans Böckler, German politician and trade union leader
 Charles V, ruler of both the Spanish Empire and the Holy Roman Empire
 Charlotte, wife of George III, King of England
 Albert Chmielowski, Polish nobleman, noted painter, disabled veteran of the Uprising of 1863
 John Church, clergyman, found as a toddler
 Pope Clement VII
 Clovis I, first King of the Franks
 Gaspard II de Coligny, Huguenot leader in the French Wars of Religion, nobleman and Admiral of France
 Saints Cyril, Byzantine Christian theologian and missionary
 Edward VI of England, orphaned at age 9
 Elizabeth I, Queen of England
 Elizabeth of Russia, Empress of Russia
 Ferdinand I, Holy Roman Emperor, Holy Roman Emperor, King of Bohemia, Hungary, and Croatia, and Archduke of Austria
 Frederick II, Holy Roman Emperor, medieval monarch
 Hans-Dietrich Genscher, Federal Minister of Foreign Affairs and Vice Chancellor of Germany
 Countess Amalie Elisabeth of Hanau-Münzenberg, Landgravine consort and Regent of Hesse-Kassel
 Henry VI, King of England and France
 Adolf Hitler, Fuhrer of Germany, orphaned at 18
 Salvador of Horta, Spanish Franciscan lay brother from the region of Catalonia in Spain
 Ivan IV, Russian ruler, orphaned at age 8
 Joan II of Navarre, Queen of Navarre
 John I, King of Portugal and the Algarve
 Konstantinos Kanaris, Greek Prime Minister, admiral and politician, freedom fighter in the Greek War of Independence
 Rudolf Kirchschläger, Austrian diplomat, politician, judge and the eighth President of Austria
 Pope Leo X
 David Lloyd George, Welsh statesman who served as Prime Minister of the United Kingdom from 1916 to 1922
 Louis XIV, King of France or the Sun King
 Louis XV, King of France
 Louis XVI, King of France
 Maria II, Queen regnant of the Kingdom of Portugal and the Algarves
 Mary of Burgundy, Duchess of Burgundy, reigned over the Burgundian State, now mainly in France and the Low Countries
 Mary, Queen of Scots, and of France
 Catherine de' Medici, Queen of France
 Philip Melanchthon, German Lutheran reformer
 Angela Merici, Italian religious educator
 Louise Otto-Peters, German suffragist and women's rights movement activist who wrote novels, poetry, essays, and libretti
 Olof Palme, Swedish politician, statesman and Prime Minister of Sweden
 Peter the Great, Tsardom of Russia and later the Russian Empire
 Peter II of Russia, Emperor of Russia
 Peter III of Russia, Emperor of Russia
 Philip IV, of France, called the Fair or the Iron King
 Maximilien Robespierre, French politician during the French Revolution, orphaned at age 6
 Baal Shem Tov, Jewish mystic and healer from Poland
 Albrecht von Wallenstein, Bohemian military & political leader
 Wenceslaus IV of Bohemia, King of Bohemia from 1363 until his death and King of Germany
 William I, King of Prussia and the first German emperor

North America 

 William Bradford, colonial governor, orphaned at age 7
 George Clymer, early American politician
 Jefferson Davis, American politician, and President of the Confederate States
 Frederick Douglass, African-American social reformer, abolitionist, orator, writer, and statesman
 Peter Francisco, soldier, found on a Virginia dock as a young child
 Mariano Gálvez, Guatemalan politician, foundling adopted and raised by Gálvez family
 Alexander Hamilton, American politician, orphaned at age 13
 John Hancock, American merchant, statesman, and prominent Patriot of the American Revolution
 Ben W. Hooper, governor of Tennessee, raised in an orphanage
 Herbert Hoover, U.S. president, orphaned at age 9
 Andrew Jackson, U.S. president, orphaned at age 14
 Benito Juarez, Mexican president, orphaned at age 3
 George F. Kennan, American diplomat and historian
 Edward Langworthy, American politician, raised in an orphanage
 Abraham Lincoln, American statesman and lawyer who served as the 16th president of the United States from 1861 until his assassination in 1865
 Moctezuma II, ninth tlatoani or ruler of Tenochtitlan
 Malcolm X, politician and civil rights activist, raised in an orphanage and foster care
 Christopher G. Memminger, German American politician, raised in an orphanage
 James Monroe, fifth President of the United States
 Eleanor Roosevelt, U.S. First Lady & activist, orphaned at age 10
 Joseph F. Smith, American religious leader, orphaned at age 13
 Tenskwatawa, Native American religious and political leader of the Shawnee tribe
 George Washington, American political leader, military general, statesman, and Founding Father who served as the first president of the United States
 Pancho Villa, Mexican revolutionary general and one of the most prominent figures of the Mexican Revolution
 Tom Vilsack, American politician, adopted at birth

South America 
 Túpac Amaru II, Peruvian leader, orphaned at age 12
 Simón Bolívar, Latin American leader, orphaned at age 8
 Pedro II of Brazil
 Eva Perón First Lady of Argentina

Writers

Africa 
 Ingrid Jonker, South African poet

Asia 
 Kobayashi Issa, Japanese poet and lay Buddhist priest
 Yasunari Kawabata, Japanese novelist and subtly-shaded prose works won him the Nobel Prize for Literature in 1968
 Kenzaburō Ōe, Japanese writer and a major figure in contemporary Japanese literature, Nobel Prize in Literature in 1994
 Natsume Sōseki, Japanese novelist
 Ouyang Xiu, Chinese essayist, historian, poet, calligrapher, politician, and epigrapher of the Song dynasty

Australia/Oceania 
 Thomas Bracken, Irish-born New Zealand poet, journalist and politician

Europe 

 Dante Alighieri, simply called Dante, major Italian poet of the Late Middle Ages
 Alfred Andersch, German writer, publisher, and radio editor
 Hans Christian Andersen, Danish author
 Achim von Arnim, German poet, novelist and a leading figure of German Romanticism
 Bettina von Arnim, German writer and novelist
 Gustavo Adolfo Bécquer, post-romanticist poet and writer
 Thomas Bernhard, Austrian novelist, playwright and poet
 Hayim Nahman Bialik, Jewish poet
 Arrigo Boito, Italian poet, journalist, novelist, librettist and composer
 Anthony Burgess, English writer and composer
 The Brontë Sisters, English poets and novelists
 Albert Camus, French-Algerian philosopher, author, dramatist, and journalist
 Joseph Conrad, Polish-British author, orphaned at age 11
 Hedwig Courths-Mahler, German writer of formula fiction romantic novels
 Fyodor Dostoyevsky, Russian novelist, short story writer, essayist, journalist and philosopher
 Jean Genet, French novelist, playwright, poet, essayist, and political activist. In his early life he was a vagabond and petty criminal, but he later became a writer and playwright
 Nikolai Gogol, Russian/ Ukrainian novelist, short story writer and playwright
 Yvan Goll, French-German poet
 Maxim Gorky, Russian and Soviet writer, a founder of the socialist realism literary method and a political activist
 Karoline von Günderrode, German Romantic poet
 Jacob Grimm and Wilhelm Grimm, German anthropologist, philologist, jurist, and folklorist
 Alfred Grosser, German-French writer, sociologist, and political scientist
 Friedrich Hölderlin, German poet and philosopher
 Joris-Karl Huysmans, French novelist and art critic
 Attila József, Hungarian poet
 John Keats, English Romantic poet, orphaned at age 14 and raised partly by his grandmother
 Friedrich Maximilian von Klinger, German dramatist and novelist
 Eugen Kogon, Historian and Nazi concentration camp survivor
 Hugh Leonard, Irish dramatist, television writer and essayist, abandoned as an infant
 Mikhail Lermontov, Russian Romantic writer, poet and painter
 Thomas Mann, German novelist, short story writer, social critic, philanthropist, essayist, and Nobel Prize in Literature laureate
 Harry Martinson, Swedish author, poet and former sailor, He was awarded a joint Nobel Prize in Literature.
 W. Somerset Maugham, British playwright, novelist and short story writer, orphaned at age 10
 Andy McNab, English soldier and novelist, found as a baby on the steps of hospital
 Montesquieu, French man of letters, political philosopher and judge
 Eduard Mörike, German writer
 Seán O'Casey, Irish dramatist and memoirist
 Georges Perec, French novelist, filmmaker, documentalist and essayist
 Fernando Pessoa, was a Portuguese poet, writer, literary critic, translator, publisher, and philosopher
 Abbé Prévost, French author and novelist
 Anatoly Pristavkin, Russian writer and public figure
 Jean Racine, French playwright, orphaned at age 4
 Bertrand Russell, British philosopher, logician, writer and Nobel Prize for Literature laureate
 George Sand, French novelist and memoirist
 Albertine Sarrazin, French author
 Arno Schmidt, German author and translator
 Torquato Tasso, Italian poet of the 16th century
 J. R. R. Tolkien, English writer, poet, philologist and university professor, orphaned at age 12
 Leo Tolstoy, Russian author, orphaned at age 9
 William Wordsworth, English Romantic poet, orphaned at age 12

North America 

 Edward Albee, American playwright, adopted as an infant
 Neal Cassady, was a major figure and muse of the Beat Generation of the 1950s and the psychedelic and counterculture movements of the 1960s
 Gregory Corso,  was an American poet and a key member of the Beat movement
 Jan Kerouac, was an American writer and the only child of beat generation author Jack Kerouac and Joan Haverty Kerouac
 Mary McCarthy, American novelist, critic and political activist
 Herman Melville, American novelist, short story writer, and poet of the American Renaissance period
 James A. Michener, American author, abandoned as an infant
 Sylvia Plath, poet, novelist, and short-story writer
 Juan Rulfo, Mexican writer, screenwriter and photographer
 Edgar Allan Poe, author, orphaned at age 2
 Theodore Roethke, an American poet
 William Saroyan, Armenian-American novelist, playwright, and short story writer
 Henry Morton Stanley, Welsh-American journalist and explorer, raised in a workhouse
 Gertrude Stein, American novelist, poet, playwright, and art collector
 Dale Wasserman, American playwright, orphaned at age 9
 Pete Wells, American food critic, adopted as an infant

Musicians and singers

Africa 
 Cesária Évora, Cape Verdean popular singer
 Emmanuel Jal, South Sudanese-Canadian rapper
 Miriam Makeba, South African singer and activist

Asia 
 Juan Karlos Labajo, Filipino singer, abandoned by father, and mother died at age 12
 Choi Sung-bong, singer of the Republic of Korea

Australia/Oceania 
 Kiri Te Kanawa, New Zealand soprano singer, adopted as an infant

Europe 

 Johann Sebastian Bach, German composer, orphaned at age 9
 Béla Bartók, Hungarian composer, pianist, and ethnomusicologist
 Ludwig van Beethoven, German composer and pianist. Beethoven remains one of the most admired composers in the history of Western music;
 Alban Berg, Austrian composer of the Second Viennese School
 Anton Bruckner, Austrian composer known for his symphonies, masses, and motets
 Josquin des Prez, French composer and singer of the Renaissance
 Christoph Eschenbach, German-born musician
 Paul Gerhardt, German theologian, Lutheran minister and hymnodist
 George Frideric Handel, German-born Baroque composer becoming well known for his operas, oratorios, anthems, concerti grossi and organ concertos
 John Koukouzelis, Albanian Orthodox Christian composer
 John Lennon, English singer, raised by aunt and uncle
 John Lundvik, Swedish singer, songwriter, and former sprinter
 Anni-Frid Lyngstad, Swedish pop and jazz singer
 Henry Purcell, English composer
 Mstislav Rostropovich, Soviet and Russian cellist and conductor
 Antonio Salieri, Italian classical composer, conductor, and teacher
 Franz Schubert, Austrian composer of the late Classical and early Romantic eras
 Karlheinz Stockhausen, German composer

North America 

 Louis Armstrong, American musician, raised in an orphanage and by his grandmother
 Hank Ballard, American rhythm and blues singer and songwriter
 Charles Bradley,  was an American singer
 Ray Charles, American singer, orphaned at age 15
 Ibrahim Ferrer, Afro-Cuban musician
 Ella Fitzgerald, American jazz singer, orphaned in childhood
 Kirk Franklin, American gospel musician
 James Hetfield, American singer, orphaned by cancer at 16
 Faith Hill, American singer, adopted as an infant
 Billie Holiday, American jazz singer, intermittently abandoned in childhood
 Al Jolson, American singer, comedian, and actor
 B. B. King, American blues singer, electric guitarist, songwriter, and record producer
 Eartha Kitt, American singer, actress, activist and voice actress
 Jenkins Orphanage, American band in US
 Mims, American hip hop recording artist, orphaned at age 13
 Sonny Moore, American electronic dance music producer, adopted as an infant
 Trent Reznor, American singer, abandoned by parents at age 5 and raised by grandparents
 Jimmie Rodgers, American country singer
 John Rzeznik, American musician, orphaned at age 15
 Bessie Smith, American blues singer, orphaned at age 9
 Tina Turner, American singer, intermittently abandoned in childhood
 Tom Waits, American musician, composer, songwriter and actor. His father left when he was 10
 Muddy Waters, American blues musician
 Jimmy Wayne, American country music singer, homeless foster teen taken in by a couple in their 70s

South America 
 Víctor Jara, Chilean poet, singer-songwriter, teacher, theatre director and political activist
 Milton Nascimento, Brazilian singer, songwriter and guitarist

Artists, actors, and entertainers

Africa 

 Michaela DePrince, Sierra Leonean-American ballet dancer
 Ger Duany, actor, among Lost Boys of Sudan
 Charlize Theron, South African and American actress and film producer
 Natasha Joubert, South African entrepreneur, model and beauty pageant titleholder

Asia 

 Rajesh Khanna, Bollywood actor
 Nadech Kugimiya, Thai model and actor
 I. M. Pei, Chinese-American architect
 Bianca Umali, Filipino Teen actress, commercial model and recurring dancer, orphaned at 7
 Preity Zinta, Indian film actress
 Tracy Perez, Filipino model, industrial engineer, and beauty pageant titleholder

Australia/Oceania 

 Cate Blanchett, Australian actress and theatre director
 Guy Pearce, Australian actor and musician

Europe 

 Leon Battista Alberti, Italian humanist author, artist, architect, poet, priest, linguist, philosopher and cryptographer
 Max Beckmann, German painter, draftsman, printmaker, sculptor, and writer
 Ingrid Bergman, Swedish actress, orphaned at age 12
 Roger Bissière, French artist. He designed stained glass windows for Metz cathedral and several other churches.
 Gustave Boulanger, French painter, abandoned at the age of 14
 Rosa Bonheur, French artist, an animalière (painter of animals) and sculptor
 Lord Byron, English peer, who was a poet and politician
 Caravaggio, Italian painter
 Charlie Chaplin, English entertainer
 Coco Chanel, French fashion designer and entrepreneur
 Jean Maurice Eugène Clément Cocteau, a French poet, playwright, novelist, designer, filmmaker, visual artist and critic.His father, a lawyer and amateur painter, committed suicide when Cocteau was nine.
 Salvador Dalí, Spanish surrealist painter
 Daniel Day-Lewis, English actor
 Edgar Degas, French artist famous for his paintings, sculptures, prints, and drawings
 Eugène Delacroix, was a French Romantic artist regarded from the outset of his career as the leader of the French Romantic school
 Narcisse-Virgilio Díaz de la Peña, was a French painter of the Barbizon school
 Marlene Dietrich, German actress and singer
 Juliette Drouet, French actress, orphaned in childhood
 Anthony van Dyck, Flemish Baroque artist
 Albert Gustaf Aristides Edelfelt  was a Finnish-Swedish painter noted for his naturalistic style and Realist approach to art. His father died while he was young.
 Barry Evans, English actor, abandoned as an infant, raised in an orphanage
 Caspar David Friedrich, German Romantic landscape painter
 Miloš Forman, Czech-American film director, screenwriter, actor, and professor who rose to fame in his native Czechoslovakia before immigrating to the USA in 1968
 Greta Garbo, Swedish-born American film actress
 Paul Gauguin, French post-Impressionist artist
 Artemisia Gentileschi, Italian Baroque painter
 Francoise Hardy,  French singer and songwriter
 André Heller, Austrian artist, author, poet, singer, songwriter and actor
 Alfred Hitchcock, English film director, producer, and screenwriter
 Hape Kerkeling, German actor, presenter and comedian
 Deborah Kerr, Scottish-born film, theatre and television actress
 Georg Wenzeslaus von Knobelsdorff, German painter and architect in Prussia
 Isaac Levitan, was a classical Russian landscape painter who advanced the genre of the "mood landscape"
 Adolf Loos, Austrian and Czechoslovak architect and influential European theorist of Modern architecture
 Peter Lorre, Austro-Hungarian-American actor
 Andrea Mantegna, Italian Renaissance painter
 Ian McKellen, English actor
 Michelangelo, Italian sculptor, painter, architect, poet, and engineer of the High Renaissance
 Molière, French playwright and actor who and one of the greatest masters of comedy in Western literature
 Lola Montez, Irish dancer and actress who became famous as a Spanish dancer, courtesan, and mistress of King Ludwig I of Bavaria
 Armin Mueller-Stahl, German film actor, painter and author
 Edvard Munch, Norwegian painter and printmaker
 Gabriele Münter, German expressionist painter
 Friederike Caroline Neuber, German actress and theatre director
 David Niven, English actor and novelist
 Laurence Olivier, English actor
 Parmigianino, Italian Mannerist painter and printmaker
 Francis Picabia, French avant-garde painter, poet and typographist
 Roman Polanski, French-Polish film director, producer, writer, and actor
 Oleg Popov, Russian clown and circus artist
 Neo Rauch, German painter
 Raphael, Italian painter and architect of the High Renaissance
 Alan Rickman, English actor and director
 Géza Röhrig, Hungarian actor and poet, raised in an orphanage
 Peter Paul Rubens, Flemish Baroque painter
 Heinz Rühmann, German film actor
 Margaret Rutherford, English actress
 Egon Schiele, Austrian painter
 Karl Friedrich Schinkel, Prussian architect, city planner, and painter
 Oskar Schlemmer, German painter, sculptor, designer and choreographer associated with the Bauhaus school
 Rudolf Schlichter, was a German painter, engraver and writer. He was one of the most important representatives of the critical-realistic style of verism
 Joseph Edward Southall, English painter associated with the Arts and Crafts movement.
 Nicolas de Staël, French painter of Russian origin known for his use of a thick impasto and his highly abstract landscape painting
 Guillaume Taraval, French-born Swedish painter
 Joaquín Torres-García,  was a Uruguayan-Spanish artist
 Margarethe von Trotta, German film director
 Marie Tussaud, French artist known for her wax sculptures and Madame Tussauds
 Ellen von Unwerth, German photographer and director, specializing in erotic femininity
 Liv Ullmann, Norwegian actress and film director
 Roger Vadim, French screenwriter, film director and producer, as well as an author, artist and occasional actor
 Gerardus "Geer" van Velde, was a Dutch painter
 Élisabeth Louise Vigée Le Brun, French painter
 Naomi Watts, English actress and film producer
 Franco Zeffirelli, Italian director and producer of operas, films and television

North America 

 Tallulah Bankhead, American actress, orphaned as an infant
 Buffalo Bill, American frontier figure
 Charles Bronson, Lithuanian-American film and television actor
 Carol Burnett, American actress, comedian, singer and writer, raised by her grandmother
 Mary Cassatt, American painter and printmaker
 William Castle, American film figure, orphaned at age 11
 Henry Darger,  American writer and artist (whose work focused on orphans), orphaned at age 13.
 Tommy Davidson, American comedian, orphaned as infant
 James Dean, American actor
 Benicio del Toro, Puerto Rican actor
 Cecil B. DeMille, American filmmaker
 William C. DeMille, American screenwriter and director
 Jane Fonda, American actress, writer, political activist and fitness guru
 Peter Fonda, American actor, director, and screenwriter
 Clark Gable, American film actor, often referred to as "The King of Hollywood" or just simply as "The King"
 Ava Gardner, American actress and singer
 John Garfield, American actor
 Judy Garland, American actress, singer and vaudevillian
 Bill Graham, German-American impresario and rock concert promoter
 D. W. Griffith, American film director, writer, and producer
 Gene Hackman, American actor and novelist
 Oliver Hardy, American actor of Laurel and Hardy
 Mariska Hargitay, American actress
 Ice-T, American rapper and actor, rapper, orphaned at age 12
 Brian Jungen, Dene-Zaa artist
 Danny Kaye, American actor, singer, dancer, comedian, and musician
 Veronica Lake, American film, stage, and television actress
 Art Linkletter, Canadian-born American radio and television personality and entertainer, abandoned as an infant
 Ray Liotta, American actor, film producer and voice actor, adopted at 6 months
 George Lopez, American comedian, raised by a grandmother
 Myrna Loy, American film, television and stage actress
 Lee Majors, American film, television and voice actor, orphaned at age 2 & raised by aunt and uncle
 Jayne Mansfield, American actress in film, theatre, television and Playboy Playmates
 Jayne Marie Mansfield, Playboy nude model
 Frances McDormand, American actress, adopted as an infant
 Marilyn Monroe, entertainer, raised in foster care
 Eddie Murphy, American comedian, actor, writer, singer and producer
 Steve Oedekerk, American comedian and film producer, adopted as an infant
 Mary Pickford, Canadian-American film actress, writer, director, and producer
 Priscilla Presley, American actress and entrepreneur
 Kelly Preston, American actress
 Anthony Quinn, Mexican-born American actor, painter and writer
 Julia Roberts, American actress and producer
 Jane Russell, American film actress and one of Hollywood's leading sex symbols
 Gene Siskel, American film critic, orphaned at age 9 & raised by aunt and uncle
 Barbara Stanwyck, American actress, raised in foster homes from age 2
 Barbra Streisand, American singer, songwriter, actress, and filmmaker
 Lana Turner, American actress
 Andy Warhol, American artist who was a leading figure in the visual art movement known as pop art
 Orson Welles, American actor and director, orphaned at age 15
 Jeffrey Wright is an American actor whose father died when he was a child
 Darryl F. Zanuck, American film producer, abandoned at age 13

South America 
 Ivian Sarcos, Miss World 2011, orphaned at age 8

Athletes

Africa 
 Eusébio, Portuguese footballer who played as a striker and first world-class African-born players
 Guor Marial, Olympic runner, one of the Lost Boys of Sudan
 Victor Moses, professional footballer
 Emmanuel Ofosu Yeboah, African triathlete and advocate for the rights of the disabled

Asia 
 Garry Kasparov, Russian chess grandmaster, former World Chess Champion
 Iftikhar Ali Khan Pataudi, captain of the India national cricket team for the tour to England in 1946
 Mansoor Ali Khan Pataudi, Indian cricketer and former captain of the Indian cricket team
 Greysia Polii, former Indonesian badminton player
 Milkha Singh, known as The Flying Sikh, is an Indian former track and field sprinter

Australia/Oceania 
 Layne Beachley, Australian surfer, she won the World Championship
 Jason Day, Australian professional golfer and PGA Tour member
 Jack Lovelock, New Zealand athlete, and the 1936 Olympic champion
 Wendell Sailor, Australian former professional rugby football player

Europe 
 Alberto Ascari, Italian racing driver and twice Formula One World Champion
 Oksana Baiul, Ukrainian former competitive figure skater, World and Olympic champion
 Franco Baresi, Italian professional football player and coach
 Johan Cruyff, Dutch professional football player and coach
 Moritz Fürste, German field hockey player, Olympic champion 2008 and 2012
 Sepp Herberger, German football player and manager of the West German national team which won the 1954 FIFA World Cup final
 James Mason, Irish-born chess player, journalist and writer
 Declan McCormick, English Junior and British Youth Weightlifting Champion
 Paavo Nurmi, Finnish middle- and long-distance runner
 Jochen Rindt, racing driver, the only driver to posthumously win the Formula One
 Daley Thompson, English former decathlete, Olympic, World- and European champion
 Walter Tull, English professional footballer and British Army officer of Afro-Caribbean descent

North America 
 Simone Biles, American Olympic gymnast, adopted by her grandparents
 Steve Van Buren, professional American football halfback
 Nicholas Delpopolo, American judoka
 Édouard Fabre, Canadian marathon runner
 Scott Hamilton, figure skater, adopted as an infant
 Aaron Hernandez, American football tight end and convicted murderer
 Morgan Hurd, American gymnast, adopted as an infant
 Carlin Isles, American rugby star, adopted at age 8
 Colin Kaepernick, American civil rights activist and American football quarterback
 Lopez Lomong, U.S. Olympic track star, one of the Lost Boys of Sudan
 Greg Louganis, American Olympic diver, adopted as an infant
 Karl Malone, American basketball player
 Billy Mills, American Olympic runner, orphaned at age 12
 Babe Ruth, American baseball star, raised in an orphanage
 Gunboat Smith, Irish-American Boxer, grew up in orphanages around the Philadelphia area
 Jim Thorpe, American multi-sport Olympic and professional athlete, orphaned as a teen
 Jacques Villeneuve, Canadian professional auto racing driver

South America 
 Gustavo Kuerten, tennis player from Brazil, nickname as Guga, is a retired World No. 1
 Rivaldo, Brazilian former professional footballer

Scientists and scholars

Africa 
 Maud Chifamba, the youngest university student in Africa, orphaned at age 14
 Ibn Khaldun, North African Arab historiographer and historian lost both of his parents at age of 17

Europe 

 Jean le Rond d'Alembert, French mathematician, abandoned as an infant
 Lou Andreas-Salomé, Russian-born psychoanalyst and a well-traveled author, narrator, and essayist
 Jöns Jacob Berzelius, Swedish chemist and one of the founders of modern chemistry
 Elizabeth Blackwell, British-born physician
 Sabina Baldoncelli, Italian pharmacist
 Ludwig Boltzmann, Austrian physicist and philosopher
 Robert Boyle, Anglo-Irish natural philosopher, chemist, physicist and inventor
 Henry Cavendish, British natural philosopher, scientist, and an important experimental and theoretical chemist and physicist
 Nicolaus Copernicus, Polish Renaissance mathematician and astronomer
 Benedetto Croce, Italian idealist philosopher, historian and politician
 Marie Curie, Polish and naturalized-French physicist and chemist who conducted pioneering research on radioactivity, the first woman to win a Nobel Prize, and the only one to win two.
 Charles Darwin, English naturalist, geologist and biologist
 René Descartes, French philosopher and polymath
 Arthur Eddington, English astronomer, physicist, and mathematician
 Willem Einthoven, Dutch doctor, physiologist and received the Nobel Prize in Physiology or Medicine
 Lodovico Ferrari, Italian mathematician
 Alexander Fleming, Scottish biologist, pharmacologist and botanist
 Joseph von Fraunhofer, German optician
 Hans-Georg Gadamer, German philosopher of the continental tradition
 Fritz Haber, German chemist who received the Nobel Prize in Chemistry
 Georg Wilhelm Friedrich Hegel, German philosopher and an important figure of German idealism
 Alexander von Humboldt, Prussian polymath
 Wilhelm von Humboldt, Prussian philosopher and public figure
 David Hume, Scottish philosopher, historian, economist, and essayist
 James Hutton, Scottish geologist, physician, chemical manufacturer, naturalist, and experimental agriculturalist
 Edward Jenner, English physician and scientist, who was the pioneer of smallpox vaccine, the world's first vaccine
 Irène Joliot-Curie, French scientist second woman to win a Nobel Prize
 Immanuel Kant, German philosopher who is considered the central figure of modern philosophy
 Johannes Kepler, German scientist, raised by grandmother
 Antoine Lavoisier, French chemist and father of modern chemistry
 Antonie van Leeuwenhoek, Dutch tradesman and scientist
 Gottfried Wilhelm Leibniz, German polymath and philosopher
 Hendrik Lorentz, Dutch physicist, who shared the Nobel Prize in Physics
 Ada Lovelace, English mathematician and writer, chiefly known for her work on Charles Babbage's early mechanical general-purpose computer, the Analytical Engine
 James Clerk Maxwell, Scottish scientist in the field of mathematical physics
 John McDouall Stuart, Scottish explorer and one of the most accomplished of all Australia's inland explorers
 Dmitri Mendeleev, Russian chemist and inventor
 Gerardus Mercator, Geographer, cosmographer and cartographer
 Maria Sibylla Merian, German-born naturalist and scientific illustrator
 Gustav Nachtigal, German explorer of Central and West Africa
 Isaac Newton, English physicist and mathematician

 Friedrich Nietzsche, German philosopher, writer, and linguist
 Richard Owen, English biologist, comparative anatomist and paleontologist
 Blaise Pascal, French mathematician, physicist, inventor, writer and Christian philosopher
 André Patry,  French astronomer and discoverer of 9 minor planets in the late 1930s
 Emmi Pikler, Hungarian pediatrician and infant-education theorist
 Paul Ricœur, French philosopher,  for combining phenomenological description with hermeneutics
 Jean-Jacques Rousseau, French philosopher, raised by aunt and uncle
 Arthur Rudolph, German rocket engineer
 Bertrand Russell, British philosopher, orphaned at age 3
 Jean-Paul Sartre, French philosopher, writer, and activist
 Arthur Schopenhauer, German philosopher
 Georg Simmel, German sociologist, philosopher, and critic
 Adam Smith, Scottish moral philosopher and pioneer of political economy
 Baruch Spinoza, Dutch philosopher of Sephardi/Portuguese origin
 Voltaire, French Enlightenment writer, historian and philosopher
 Wilhelm Wundt, German physician, physiologist, philosopher, and professor

North America 
 John Bardeen, American physicist and electrical engineer
 George Washington Carver, American scientist, inventor, orphaned while a slave
 Stephanie Kwolek, American chemist
 Linus Pauling, American chemist, biochemist, peace activist, author, and educator
 Percy Spencer, American inventor, orphaned in childhood
 Robert Taylor, American internet pioneer, adopted at age 28 days
 Blake R. Van Leer, President of Georgia Tech, engineer and United States Army officer

Business people

Asia 
 Ian Karan, Tamil German businessman and politician

Europe 

 Roman Abramovich, Russian businessman and politician
 Gianni Agnelli, Italian industrialist and principal shareholder of Fiat
 Anthony Bacon, British iron pioneer
 Karl Benz, German engine designer and automobile engineer
 André Citroën, French industrialist and freemason
 Thomas Cook, English founded the travel agency Thomas Cook & Son
 Mario Draghi, Italian economist and central banker who served as President of the European Central Bank
 Jakob Fugger, German major merchant, mining entrepreneur and banker of Europe
 Alfred Krupp, German steel manufacturer and inventor, nickname "The Cannon King"
 Christine Lagarde, French Managing Director (MD)  of the International Monetary Fund
 Wilhelm Maybach, German engine designer and industrialist
 Rudolf August Oetker, German entrepreneur
 Aristotle Onassis, Greek shipping magnate
 Mary Portas, English retail consultant, and broadcaster, orphaned at age 18
 Vidal Sassoon, British beauty products magnate, placed in an orphanage at age 7
 Hugo Stinnes, German industrialist
 Hans Wilsdorf, German-born British founder of noted watch brands Rolex and Tudor
 Ferdinand von Zeppelin, German general and aircraft manufacturer

North America 
 Arthur E. Andersen, American accounting firm founder, orphaned as a teen
 L.L. Bean, American retail catalog magnate, orphaned at age 12
 William Boeing, American aviation pioneer who founded The Boeing Company
 Adolph Coors, German American brewer who founded the Adolph Coors Company
 August Duesenberg and Fred Duesenberg, German-born American automobile pioneers, designers, manufacturers and sportsmen
 Henry Ford, American founder of Ford Motor Company
 Samuel Goldwyn, American film mogul, raised by relatives
 John Hancock, American merchant, statesman and prominent Patriot of the American Revolution
 Howard Hughes, American entrepreneur
 Jenna Jameson, American entrepreneur, webcam model and former pornographic film actress
 Steve Jobs, American Apple Computer founder, adopted as infant
 Howard Lutnick, American CEO of Cantor Fitzgerald, orphaned as a teen
 John Molson, 18th century Canadian brewer
 Tom Monaghan, American Domino's Pizza founder, partially raised in an orphanage
 Colonel Sanders, American businessman, founder of Kentucky Fried Chicken
 Carlos Slim, Mexican business magnate, investor, and philanthropist
 Henry E. Steinway, German-American piano maker
 Levi Strauss, American Jewish businessman
 Dave Thomas, American Wendy's entrepreneur adoption advocate, adopted as an infant
 Madam C. J. Walker, American entrepreneur, philanthropist, and political and social activist
 Jerry Yang, Taiwanese American Internet entrepreneur and programmer

Otherwise notables

Asia 
 Kanō Jigorō, Japanese educator and athlete, the founder of Judo
 Oda Nobunaga, powerful daimyō of Japan
 Swami Rama, Indian yógī
 Natalya Stroeva, Russian model and beauty pageant titleholder
 Kazuo Taoka, one of the most prominent yakuza godfathers
 Minamoto no Yoshitomo, head of the Minamoto clan and a general of Japanese history
 Minamoto no Yoshitsune, nobleman and military commander of the Minamoto clan of Japan
 Lu Yu, ancient author of The Classic of Tea
 Osama bin Laden, founder of

Australia/Oceania 
 Truganini, Aboriginal Tasmanian

Europe 

 Roald Amundsen, Norwegian polar explorer
 Robert Baden-Powell, 1st Baron Baden-Powell, British Army officer, founder and first Chief Scout of The Boy Scouts Association
 William Blackstone, English jurist and political figure
 Zofia Potocka, Greek slave courtesan and a Russian agent, later a Polish noble
 George Blake, British spy who worked as a double agent for the Soviet Union
 Martin Bormann, prominent official in Nazi Germany as head of the Nazi Party Chancellery
 Johann Friedrich Böttger, German alchemist and the first European to discover the secret of the creation of hard-paste porcelain
 Guy Burgess, British radio producer, intelligence officer and Foreign Office official
 William Dampier, Englishman to explore parts of what is today Australia and pirate
 Karl Dönitz, German admiral who played a major role in the naval history of World War II
 Adolf Eichmann, German Nazi SS-Obersturmbannführer (lieutenant colonel) and one of the major organisers of the Holocaust
 Prince Eugene of Savoy, general of the Imperial Army and one of the most successful military commanders in modern European history
 Guy Fawkes, known as Guido Fawkes, member of a group of provincial English Catholics who planned the failed Gunpowder Plot
 Antoine Galland, French orientalist and archaeologist, most famous as the first European translator of One Thousand and One Nights
 Hermann Gmeiner, Austrian philanthropist and the founder of SOS Children's Villages
 Adam Griffith, American football player from Poland
 Mata Hari, Dutch exotic dancer and courtesan who was convicted of being a spy for Germany during World War I
 Kaspar Hauser, German youth who claimed to have grown up in the total isolation of a darkened cell
 Rudolf Höss, Nazi German SS-Obersturmbannführer (lieutenant colonel) and the longest-serving commandant of Auschwitz concentration and extermination camp in World War II
 Wilhelm Keitel, German field marshal who served as chief of the Oberkommando der Wehrmacht (Supreme Command of the Armed Forces, the OKW) for most of World War II
 Otto Lilienthal, German pioneer of aviation
 Luigi Lucheni, Italian anarchist who assassinated the Austrian Empress, Elisabeth
 Louis Philippe II, Colonel General (France) and member of a cadet branch of the House of Bourbon
 Ferdinand Magellan, Portuguese explorer
 John McDouall Stuart, Scottish explorer and one of the most accomplished of all Australia's inland explorers
 Erich Mielke, head of the East German Ministry for State Security (Ministerium für Staatsicherheit), better known as the Stasi
 Fridtjof Nansen, Norwegian explorer, scientist, diplomat, humanitarian and Nobel Peace Prize laureate
 Horatio Nelson, 1st Viscount Nelson, British flag officer in the Royal Navy
 Johann Heinrich Pestalozzi, Swiss pedagogue and educational reformer
 Elisabeth Petznek, nicknamed "The Red Archduchess"
 Albert Pierrepoint, hangman in England
 Grigory Potemkin, Russian military leader, statesman, nobleman and favourite of Catherine the Great
 Joseph Priestley, English theologian, English Dissenters clergyman, multi-subject educator
 Grigori Rasputin, Russian peasant and mystical faith healer
 Johann Philipp Reis, German scientist and inventor, he constructed the first make-and-break telephone
 Salvatore Riina, chief of the Sicilian Mafia
 Hartmann Schedel, German physician, humanist, historian, and one of the first cartographers to use the printing press
 Heinrich Schliemann, German archaeologist
 Richard Sorge, Soviet military intelligence officer during World War II
 Valentina Tereshkova, Russian cosmonaut and the first woman to have flown in space
 Friedrich von der Trenck, Prussian officer, adventurer, and author
 Victor of Aveyron, French feral child
 Minik Wallace, Inuk anthropology subject
 Raoul Wallenberg, Swedish architect, businessman, diplomat and humanitarian
 Arthur Wellesley, 1st Duke of Wellington, Field Marshal

North America 
 John Wilkes Booth, American stage actor who assassinated President Abraham Lincoln
 Nikolas Cruz, perpetrator of the Stoneman Douglas High School shooting
 Dieter Dengler, United States Navy aviator
 Genie, pseudonym for a feral child who was a victim of severe abuse, neglect, and social isolation
 Peggy Guggenheim, American art collector and bohemian socialite
 Calamity Jane, American frontierswoman and professional scout
 Caroline Kennedy, American author, attorney, diplomat and her brother John F. Kennedy Jr., American lawyer and journalist
 Billy the Kid, American Old West gunfighter who participated in New Mexico's Lincoln County War
 Robert E. Lee, American general known for commanding the Confederate Army of Northern Virginia in the American Civil War
 Jim Lovell, former NASA astronaut and a retired captain in the United States Navy
 Marisol Malaret, Puerto Rican TV Host, model and beauty queen
 James Naismith, Canadian-American, inventor of basketball
 Annie Oakley, American sharpshooter and exhibition shooter
 Lee Harvey Oswald, American former U.S. Marine who assassinated President John F. Kennedy
 Bonnie Parker, American criminal
 Robert Peary, American explorer who claimed to have reached the geographic North Pole
 Sager orphans, twice-orphaned American settlers
 Raphael Semmes, officer in the Confederate navy during the American Civil War
 William Tecumseh Sherman, American soldier, businessman, educator and author
 James West, Scouting leader, raised in an orphanage
 Paul R. Williams, American architect
 Aileen Wuornos, American serial killer
 Pancho Villa, Mexican Revolutionary general and one of the most prominent figures of the Mexican Revolution

South America 
 Paulo Freire, Brazilian educator and philosopher who was a leading advocate of critical pedagogy.
 João Havelange, Brazilian lawyer, businessman, and athlete who served as the seventh President of FIFA
 Tiradentes, hero of Brazil and patron of the Military Police

Fictional characters

See also :Category:Fictional orphans

In literature
 Amelia, The Star Money
 several characters in the American Girl doll series
 Frodo Baggins, The Lord of the Rings
 Bambi
 Banner, Bannertail
 Captain America
 Curious George
 Violet, Klaus, and Sunny Baudelaire, A Series of Unfortunate Events
 James Bond
 Nathaniel "Natty" Bumppo/Hawkeye, Leatherstocking Tales
 Cinderella
 David Copperfield
 Cosette, Les Misérables
 Sodapop, Darrel and Ponyboy Curtis, The Outsiders
 Eragon, Inheritance Cycle
 Esmeralda
 Rosa Esposto, The Lady of the Wheel
 Jane Eyre
 Huckleberry Finn
 Moll Flanders
 Dorothy Gale, Wonderful Wizard of Oz
 Heathcliff, Wuthering Heights
 Heidi
 Tom Jones
 Kim
 Krabat
 A Little Princess
 Pippi Longstocking
 Stephen Maturin, Master and Commander
 Momo
 Mowgli
 Baron Munchausen
 Pip, Great Expectations
 Pollyanna
 Harry Potter
 Quasimodo
 Tom Sawyer
 Anne Shirley, Anne of Green Gables
 Snow White
 The Little Prince
 Daenerys Targaryen, A Song of Ice and Fire
 Tarzan
 Oliver Twist
 Lord Voldemort
 Doctor Zhivago

In popular culture

 Admiral General Aladeen, The Dictator
 Allen Walker, D.Gray-man
 Alvin and the Chipmunks
 Edward Elric and Alphonse Elric, Fullmetal Alchemist
 Batman and Robin
 Erin Hannon, The Office
 Evey Hammond, V for Vendetta
 Finn the Human, Adventure Time
 Fox McCloud, Star Fox video games
 Goku, Dragon Ball
 James Bond
 Kenshiro, Fist of the North Star
 Po, Kung Fu Panda
 Lex Luthor
 Little Orphan Annie
 Magneto, X-Men
 Naruto Uzumaki, Naruto
 Paddington Bear
 Punky Brewster
 Raiden, Metal Gear video game series
 Sailor Jupiter, Sailor Moon
 Shazam
 Snow White
 Sookie Stackhouse
 Spider-Man
 Leia Organa & Luke Skywalker, Star Wars
 Superman
 Will Hunting

Related lists
See also :Category:Adoptees for lists of notable people who have been adopted (including by step-parents): many adoptees are neither orphans nor foundlings.

References

Fictional orphans
Adoption, fostering, orphan care and displacement